A convergence center is a central place for information and meeting to serve participants during large and manifold protest or other alternative activities at summits. 

They started to be used in the 1990s as a logistic tool to solve communication problems among the large number of people present at varying activities at European Union summits, sometimes also including living quarters.

See also
Protests during the EU summit in Gothenburg 2001
27th G8 summit

Protests